Pan Hong (Chinese: 潘虹, born November 4, 1954) is a Chinese film actress.

Early life 
Born Liu Ronghua (刘蓉华) on November 4, 1954, in Shanghai. During the Cultural Revolution, her parents were forced to divorce. She then changed her surname "Liu" (her father's) to Pan (her mother's) and lived with her mother, who was born in 1922. On April 19, 1968, her father killed himself because of persecution. Two days later, she came to the crematorium alone and took her father's urn back to her father's native place, Harbin, by taking the train.

Career
After Pan graduated from the Shanghai Theatre Academy, she performed several supporting roles in films. In 1982, she shot to fame as a leading actress for At the Middle Age The movie is also known as "Ren Dao Zhong Ninan". 

Chinese critics named her "The last noble in the Chinese film industry". 

She is the vice-chairman of the China Film Association and the China Film Performance Academic Society.

In February 2021 Pan's rendition of "Once Upon a Time" was used at Shanghai Disney's Enchanted Storybook Castle.

Awards 
She was awarded a Hundred Flowers Award, Changchun Film Festival Golden Deer, Shanghai Film Critics Award. As the Golden Rooster Award for Best Actress three-time winner, Pan received a Golden Rooster Special Award in 1994.

Personal life 

Pan Hong's paternal grandfather is Russian.

In 1978, 24-year-old Pan married Mi Jiashan (米家山) who was seven years older than her (born in May 1947). Mi, at that time, was a worker in Shanghai Filmmaking Factory. Mi's hometown is in Chengdu, Sichuan. After her marriage, Pan lived in Chengdu most of time. The couple divorced in 1986. After the divorce, Pan returned to Shanghai and lived with her mother temporarily. To date, Pan has never remarried and has no children.

On New Year's Day 1989, Pan stayed in New York with a group who was shooting a film called The Last Aristocrat. The year before that, she was photographed by an American reporter and made the cover of Time in September 12th, 1988. She was the second Chinese person (the first being Deng Xiaoping) and the first Chinese actress to become the cover of the magazine. 

In January, 1995, Pan Hong published her diaries written throughout 1994.

Around 2003, Pan converted to Buddhism and became a vegetarian.

Selected filmography

Film

Television

References

External links
Dianying.com-Pan Hong

1954 births
Living people
Actresses from Shanghai
Chinese film actresses
Chinese television actresses
Shanghai Theatre Academy alumni
20th-century Chinese actresses
21st-century Chinese actresses